Mentor High School is a public high school located in Mentor, Ohio, United States.  It is the only high school in the Mentor Exempted Village School District (informally, "Mentor Schools").  At one time, it was the largest high school in Ohio based on single building enrollment.  For the 2008–2009 school year, it shifted from a three-year school (grades 10–12) to a four-year high school (grades 9–12), serving approximately 2,700 students. Mentor High School educates students from Mentor, Mentor-on-the-Lake, and parts of Kirtland Hills and Concord Township in Lake County, Ohio. Both middle schools from the Mentor Exempted Village School district, Memorial Middle School, Shore Middle School, feed into Mentor High School. The third middle school, Ridge Middle School, closed before the 2018–2019 school year had commenced, and has since been repurposed as an elementary school.

Attendance area
It serves Mentor, Mentor-on-the-Lake, a portion of Kirtland Hills, a portion of Concord Township, and a portion of Chardon Township.

Academics

Ohio Department of Education ratings
Mentor High School received ratings of excellent from the Ohio Department of Education from the 2003–2004 school year through the 2011–2012 school year.  Since the 2011–2012 school year, the Ohio Department of Education has been constructing a new statewide evaluation model and has not released overall building ratings.

National Merit Scholars
Mentor High School continues to see an increase in student achievement of National Merit recognition.
2016-2017 School Year; 7 Finalists, 10 Commended Students
2015-2016 School Year; 4 Finalists, 1 Semifinalist, 11 Commended Students
2014-2015 School Year; 2 Finalists, 3 Commended Students
2013-2014 School Year; 2 Finalists, 1 Commended Student

Independent rankings
Mentor High School has received the following independent rankings.
2016 US News High School Rankings: Bronze Medal #163 in Ohio 
2016 Niche High School Rankings: #40 in Ohio

Advanced Placement offerings
Mentor High School offers an extensive selection of 23 Advanced Placement courses including the following.

AP Art
AP Art History
AP Biology
AP Chemistry
AP Physics
AP Environmental Science
AP English Lit & Comp
AP English Language & Comp
AP Seminar
AP Research
AP Psychology
AP European History
AP U.S. History
AP Human Geography
AP American Government
AP Economics (Micro & Macro)
AP Spanish
AP German
AP French
AP Stats
AP Calculus AB & BC
AP Computer Science A
AP Computer Science Principles

College Credit Plus offerings
Mentor High School offers a College Credit Plus program where students may earn college credit through taking courses at nearby Lakeland Community College.  Two pathways are offered including a 15 credit option and 30 credit option.  For the 30 credit pathway, students may choose an area of specialization including the following.
Science, Technology, Engineering, and Math
Humanities
Business

Career Tech Education offerings
Mentor High School, through Lakeshore Compact, offers the following Career Tech Education programs in the district and through community partnerships with Lakeland Community College, Euclid High School,Wickliffe High School, and Auburn Career Center.  These include the following programs.

Urban Agriculture (Auburn)
Studio Art & Visual Design (Euclid)
Marketing & Business Administration (Mentor)
Construction Management (Lakeland & Euclid)
Early Childhood Education (Mentor)
Teaching Professions (Euclid)
Automation & Robotics (Euclid)
CAD/Engineering (Lakeland)
Allied Health (Mentor)
Exercise Science & Sports Medicine (Euclid)
Culinary Arts (Euclid)
Networking & IT Security (Lakeland)
Programming & Software Development (Lakeland)
Criminal Justice (Euclid)
Fire Science/EMT (Euclid)
Advanced Manufacturing (Lakeland)
Welding (Euclid)
Automotive Technologies (Mentor)
Mentor Fire EMT Academy (Mentor)
Business Essentials (Mentor & Euclid)
Patient Care (Euclid)
Cardinal Works (Mentor)

Extracurricular activities

Band
There are four concert bands at Mentor High School. These include Freshman Band, Grey Band, Scarlet Band, and Wind Ensemble, at increasing levels of skill. All four bands compete in OMEA contests.

Fighting Cardinal Marching Band

The Mentor High School Fighting Cardinal Marching Band, commonly called the FCMB, is a music program. The band plays at most home and away football games as well as competing at several competitions.  The FCMB received its first "Superior Rating", the highest rating possible for competitions at the state contest, in 2004 under the direction of Mr. Shawn Vondran and Mr. Byron Hunsicker.  During the 2012–2013 school year, the band earned another Superior rating at state contest with their show "I Believe." They also performed live for Fox 8 News in front of The Rock and Roll hall of Fame, and performed at a campaign rally when President Obama came to Mentor High School during the 2012 Presidential Election. The band qualified for the state contest again in the fall of 2014, where they received their third Superior rating with their show entitled "The Divine Comedy."

Orchestra
Mentor has four orchestras in its program, including Concert, Sinfonia, Symphony, and Mannheim. Concert Orchestra is the smallest group, composed of stringed instruments and requires no audition to join. Sinfonia is a string-only ensemble for younger students who are committed to practicing but not yet prepared for Symphony Orchestra. Symphony Orchestra is the largest group and consists of string, percussion and wind instruments. Mannheim Chamber Orchestra is the most selective group and consists entirely of stringed instruments.

Choir
There are four curricular concert choirs that perform at concerts, festivals, and OMEA adjudicated events throughout the year.  In addition, there are two vocal chamber ensembles and an auditioned show choir.

Science Olympiad
Mentor Science Olympiad has demonstrated a recent history of success.  Top team finishes at the Ohio State Tournament include a first-place performance in 2017, second place in 2015, second place in 2009, and second place in 2007.  Top team finishes at the National Tournament include a fourteenth-place finish in 2017, fifteenth-place finish in 2015, seventh-place finish in 2009, and fifth-place finish in 2007.

Athletics

Mentor High School is classified as a Division I High School in the Ohio High School Athletic Association (OHSAA).  Formerly of the Lake Erie League (LEL) and the Northeast Ohio Conference (NOC), Mentor now competes in the Greater Cleveland Conference (GCC)

The Mentor Cardinals have won several team and individual state championship titles sponsored by the OHSAA.

Team State Champions
 Boys Track and Field - 1933
 Boys Cross Country - 1985
 Boys Soccer - 1994
 Boys Basketball - 2013
 Girls Track and Field -2021

Athletic highlights
Mentor (25-5) defeated Toledo Rogers (21-8), 76–67, to win the boys basketball Division I state championship in front of 9,566 in Value City Arena on the campus of Ohio State University located in Columbus, OH.  In the semi-final game, Mentor defeated previously undefeated Columbus Northland (29-1), 80–69.  

Coach Lee Tressel led the Mentor Cardinals football team to 34 consecutive victories in the 1950s.

Clubs and organizations

Actively Caring 
Anime/Video Gamers Club
AP Mentors
Athletic Trainers
Book Club
CARDS Anti-Bullying
Community Service
Cooking Club
Cross Country Ski Club
Creative Writing Club
Dance Team
DECA (Association of Business and Marketing Students)
Ecology Club
Fishing Club
Future Leaders Club
GAHTAH
Green Mentor Club
HOSA (Future Health Professionals)
Improv Club
The Inkwell (on-line school newspaper)
Intramurals
KPop Club (Korean Pop Culture Club)
Math League
Mock Trial
Model U.N.
National Honor Society
PRIDE (Gay/Straight Alliance)
RPG Club (Role Playing/Pen and Paper Games)
Red Lightning Club (Photography Club)
Refuge (Christian Student Group)
Robotics Team
Sailing Club
Snowboarding/Ski Club
Speech and Debate Club
Student Government
Theatre
Web Team
World Travelers
Yearbook

Notable alumni
Tom Barndt – NFL Football player
Gary Durchik – NCAA, Canadian Football League, and Canadian Junior Football League Football Coach
Bob Hallen – NFL Football Player
Johnny Joo - Photographer/writer
Dustin Kirby – MLS Soccer Player
Dave Lucas – Poet Laureate of the State of Ohio
Dan Ryczek – NFL Football Player
Paul Ryczek –  NFL Football Player
Michael Salinger – Author
Katie Spotz – Endurance rower
Jason Surrell – Show Writer and Producer
Mitchell Trubisky — 2012 Mr. Football Award recipient, 2nd pick overall in the 2017 NFL Draft, Chicago Bears
Sinisa Ubiparipovic – MLS Soccer Player – Montreal Impact
David Wilcox – Recording Artist
Micah Potter – Basketball Player

Student suicides

Five students died by suicide in an approximately four-year period ending in 2008, allegedly as a result of harassment or bullying from fellow students.  The suicides prompted two of the families to file lawsuits against the school, one of which was settled out of court in 2014 and the other was dismissed in 2015. This is depicted by the 2014 documentary Mentor.

Notes and references

External links

Mentor Public Schools

Educational institutions established in 1923
High schools in Lake County, Ohio
Mentor, Ohio
Public high schools in Ohio
1923 establishments in Ohio